Events from the year 2014 in Kuwait.

Incumbents
Emir: Sabah Al-Ahmad Al-Jaber Al-Sabah 
Prime Minister: Jaber Al-Mubarak Al-Hamad Al-Sabah

Sports

 2013–14 Kuwaiti Federation Cup.
 2013–14 Kuwait Emir Cup.

See also
Years in Jordan
Years in Syria

References

 
Kuwait
Kuwait
Years of the 21st century in Kuwait
2000s in Kuwait